El Aouana Island, or the island of dreams are also called the island of the Mediterranean Sea, just 950 meters from the beach El Aouana mandate of Jijel.

Islands of Algeria